Méliès International Festivals Federation (MIFF), formerly European Fantastic Film Festivals Federation (EFFFF), established in 1987, is a network of 22 genre film festivals from 16 countries based Brussels, Belgium, and dedicated to promoting and supporting European cinema, particularly films in the fantasy, horror and science fiction genres.

Ernest Mathijs and Jamie Sexton describe it as "the biggest fan-based cult-network on the continent", comparable in scope to World Science Fiction Convention, San Diego Comic-Con International, and Fangoria's Weekend of Horrors, though less commercial.

The MIFF annually awards the Méliès d'Or (Golden Méliès) for the best European fantastic feature film and short film, and the Federation Award for Best Asian Film.

History 
The MIFF was founded in 1987 on the initiative of five film festivals: the Fantafestival in Rome, Fantasporto in Porto, the Paris International Festival of Fantastic and Science-Fiction Film, the Brussels International Fantastic Film Festival and the Sitges Film Festival.

The MIFF created its first awards in 1995, the Méliès d'Argent (Silver Méliès) and the Méliès d'Or (Golden Méliès), named in honour of Georges Méliès, the great French pioneer of fantastic cinema and special effects. The awards were intended to highlight the creativity and quality of European fantastic films, stimulate production and promote them worldwide. The first Méliès d'Or ceremony was held by the Brussels International Fantastic Film Festival in 1996 and the prize was given to Álex de la Iglesia for The Day of the Beast (Spanish: El día de la Bestia). Variety has called the Melies d'Or "Europe's top plaudit for horror pictures".

Member festivals

Affiliated members
Brussels International Festival of Fantasy Film, Brussels, Belgium
Sitges Film Festival, Sitges, Spain
Imagine Film Festival, Amsterdam, The Netherlands
Lund International Fantastic Film Festival, Lund, Sweden
MOTELx - Lisbon International Horror Film Festival, Lisbon, Portugal
Neuchâtel International Fantastic Film Festival, Neuchâtel, Switzerland
Strasbourg European Fantastic Film Festival, Strasbourg, France
Trieste Science+Fiction Festival, Trieste, Italy

Adherent members
Abertoir: The International Horror Festival of Wales, Aberystwyth, Wales
Court Metrange Festival, Rennes, France
FanCine Málaga - Festival de Cine Fantástico, Málaga, Spain
Grossmann film and wine festival, Ljutomer, Slovenia
Haapsalu Horror & Fantasy Film Festival, Haapsalu, Estonia
HARD:LINE International Film Festival, Regensburg, Germany
Molins de Rei Horror Film Festival, Molins de Rei, Spain
Razor Reel Flanders Film Festival, Bruges, Belgium
San Sebastian Horror & Fantasy Film Festival, San Sebastián, Spain
Splat!FilmFest, Warsaw & Lublin, Poland

Supporting members
Fantasia International Film Festival, Montreal, Quebec, Canada
Fantaspoa International Fantastic Film Festival, Porto Alegre, Brazil
Fantastic Fest, Austin, Texas
Mórbido Fest, Puebla, Mexico
Puchon International Fantastic Film Festival, Bucheon, South Korea
Screamfest Horror Film Festival, Hollywood, Los Angeles, California

Former members
Cinénygma Luxembourg International Film Festival, Luxembourg City, Luxembourg
Dead by Dawn, Edinburgh, Scotland
Espoo Ciné International Film Festival, Espoo, Finland
Fantafestival, Rome, Italy
Fantasporto, Porto, Portugal
Horrorthon Film Festival, Dublin, Ireland
London FrightFest Film Festival, London, England
NatFilm Festival, Copenhagen, Denmark
Ravenna Nightmare Film Fest, Ravenna, Italy
Riga International Fantasy Film Festival, Riga, Latvia
Utopiales, Nantes, France

References

External links
 

Culture in Brussels
Fantasy and horror film festivals
Film organisations in Belgium
Arts organizations established in 1987
European cinema
1987 establishments in Europe
Science fiction film festivals